Idir an Dá Sholas (Between the Two Lights) is a music album by Irish musicians Maighread Ní Dhomhnaill, Tríona Ní Dhomhnaill and Dónal Lunny. It was released worldwide in 1999.

Track listing
"Spanish Lady"
"Liostail Mé le Sáirsint"
"Dónall Óg"
"Banks of Claudy"
"Bruach Na Carraige Báine"
"Níl Sé Ina Lá"
"Méilte Cheann Dubhrann"
"Ar a Ghabháil 'un a' Chuain Dom"
"Foireann an Bháid"
"Faoitín"
"Pill, Pill, a Rúin"
"Tidy Ann"

External links
 Gael Linn Record company

1999 albums
Maighread Ní Dhomhnaill albums
Tríona Ní Dhomhnaill albums
Dónal Lunny albums